This is a list of radio stations in the Mexican state of Quintana Roo, which can be sorted by their call signs, frequencies, location, ownership, names, and programming formats.

Notes

References 

Quintana Roo
Quintana Roo